Nori may be,

 Nori language (Papuan)
 Nori language (Colombia)